Thurston Hunt (executed 31 March 1601 at Lancaster) was an English Roman Catholic priest. He was tried and executed with Robert Middleton, also a priest. They were declared to be martyrs by the Catholic Church, and beatified in 1987, by Pope John Paul II. 

A contemporary sang of

Hunt's hawtie corage staut,
With godlie zeale soe true,
Myld Middleton, O what tongue
Can halfe thy vertue showe!

History
Robert Middleton was from York. Born in 1571, he was a nephew of Margaret (Middleton) Clitheroe, who was pressed to death in 1586 for refusing to enter a plea to the charge of harbouring Catholic priests. Initially a member of the Church of England, he became a practicing Catholic and went to Rheims to study at the English College. From there he went to the English College of St Gregory in Seville, and then in 1597 to the English College in Rome. 
He was ordained on January 4, 1598 and then a few months later left for the English mission. Prior to being captured in the autumn of 1600, he had expressed a wish to join the Jesuits. 

Thurston Hunt was born in 1555, and belonged to a family living at Carlton Hall, near Leeds. He also had studied for the priesthood at Rheims (1583–84). When Middleton was arrested by chance near Preston, an attempt to rescue him was then made by four Catholics, of whom Hunt was one, but the attempt failed. After a long tussle, Hunt was himself captured.

The two were heavily shackled night and day. By order of the Privy Council, with their feet tied beneath their horses' bellies, they were carried in public disgrace up to London and back again to Lancaster, where they were condemned and executed for having been ordained overseas and daring to return as priests. The local population showed their disapproval; no one would hire out his horse to drag them to the place of execution. They were hanged until almost dead, then cut down and beheaded. Their relics were quickly carried off after their death.

See also
 Douai Martyrs

References

Attribution
 The entry cites:
John Hungerford Pollen, Unpublished Documents relating to the English Martyrs, Catholic Record Society Records series V (1908), 384–9;

1601 deaths
16th-century English Roman Catholic priests
English beatified people
Year of birth unknown
16th-century Roman Catholic martyrs
17th-century Roman Catholic martyrs
Eighty-five martyrs of England and Wales
Martyred Roman Catholic priests
Clergy from Leeds